Banaybanay, officially the Municipality of Banaybanay, is a 2nd class municipality in the province of Davao Oriental, Philippines. According to the 2020 census, it has a population of 44,451 people.

Etymology
Banaybanay is derived from the two native words Banay (Kalagan word), meaning sprout due to its main livelihood in the area which is rice farming, and Bânay (Cebuano word) means clans due to the family clans that arrived in that area that came from Visayas Islands and Luzon and settled there along together with the Kalagans and Mandayan natives.

History 
Banaybanay was primarily inhabited by the Mandayas in the uplands of Causwagan, Panikian and Mahayag, and Kalagans in shorelines and the mouth rivers of Piso, Pongoton, Mogbongcogon and Maputi which they have a strong settlement and a Muslim governance on that area leads by a Datus or Imams.

Around 1800s before Uyanguren arrived in the Davao, there was a strong community of the Kalagans (Kagan) in the Piso lead by a chieftain named Datu Panayangan. Their dwelling was along the river Delta of Piso,  along with his people who living there peacefully.

The story of the arrival of the Kallaw people from Samal Island is very well known especially among the Kalagans of Banaybanay. They arrived in the Piso to settle there along with their Kalagan brothers on the permission of Datu Panayangan. The Kallaw chieftain named Datu Lamaran reconciled with Datu Panayangan to settle the swampy place of Piso which today the Barrio Pongoton from the word pangotanan  means "a place of abundance of fish and crabs to catch".

Until now, the grandsons or the clans of Datu Panayangan and Datu Lamaran are still living on the areas that divide into many families.

Geography

Climate

Barangays
Banaybanay is politically subdivided into 14 barangays.
 Cabangcalan
 Caganganan
 Calubihan
 Causwagan
 Punta Linao
 Mahayag
 Maputi
 Mogbongcogon
 Panikian 
 Pintatagan
 Piso Proper
 Poblacion
 San Vicente
 Rang-ay

Demographics

Economy

References

External links
 
 Banaybanay Profile at the DTI Cities and Municipalities Competitive Index
 [ Philippine Standard Geographic Code]
 Philippine Census Information
 Local Governance Performance Management System

Municipalities of Davao Oriental